Richard Laermer (born September 16, 1961 in Queens, New York) is the author of eight books and CEO of RLM Public Relations, a PR firm he founded in 1991. He lived in New York, Connecticut, and La Quinta, California.

Laermer's book Full Frontal PR has been used as a text in public relations courses at universities including Georgia Southern, and he is quoted as a reference on marketing effectiveness, marketing strategy, consumerism, advertising and "no comment." Laermer's Native's Guide to New York was called a "top three NYC guide" by the Guardian.

In 2007, Laermer was inducted into the PR News Hall of Fame.

Bibliography 
 2011: Trendspotting for the Next Decade (2008; McGraw-Hill)
 Punk Marketing: Get Off Your Ass and Join the Revolution, co-authored with Mark Simmons (author) (2007; HarperCollins) (2009)
 Full Frontal PR: Building Buzz About Your Business, Your Product, or You (2003; Bloomberg Press) (2004)
 Native's Guide to New York: Advice With Attitude for People Who Live Here—And Visitors We Like (2002; W. W. Norton & Company) (2001) (2000) (1999) (1998)
 Trendspotting: Think Forward, Get Ahead, Cash in on the Future (2002; Perigee Trade)
 Get on with It: The Gay and Lesbian Guide to Getting Online (1997; Broadway Books)
 Gay and Lesbian Guide to New York City (1994; Plume)
 Bargain Hunting in Greater New York (1990; Prima Lifestyles)

References

External links 
 RLM Public Relations

 Punk Marketing

Articles by Laermer
 Huffington Post Author Page
 "In Planned Layovers, Delight in Discovering America" (New York Times)

Articles about Laermer
 "When the Grass Is Not Greener" (New York Times)

Punk Marketing
 Advertising Age

Living people
American non-fiction writers
American chief executives
1961 births
People from La Quinta, California